The Vietnam Open is an international Badminton open held in Vietnam since 1996.

In the first edition, the 1997 Badminton Asia Championships runners-up Lee Wan Wah and Choong Tan Fook were the winners in the men's doubles event. After another edition in 1997, the championships were halted for 8 years, then helded again in the BWF calendar in 2006. In 2007 they were established as a BWF Grand Prix event. The 2018 Vietnam Open was the first Super 100 tournament and part of the BWF World Tour. In a revamp starting from 2023, this was the only tournament to retain its status and existence.

Previous winners

Performances by nation

Note

References

 
Badminton tournaments in Vietnam